Edward Vincent Brown (5 February 1922 – 11 May 1989) was an Australian rules footballer who played for Carlton in the Victorian Football League (VFL) during the 1940s.

Brown possessed exceptional pace, he was a Stawell Gift finalist in 1946, and was used on the wing when he started out at Carlton during the 1941 VFL season. In his second season Brown began playing as a key defender to fill the gap left by players who were serving in the war and was full-back in Carlton's 1945 premiership side, where he stood South Melbourne's star forward Laurie Nash. 

Brown was a half back flanker in Carlton's next premiership, playing most of the Grand Final on Essendon's leading player Dick Reynolds. A twisted ankle sustained in the 1948 VFL season prompted Brown to announce his retirement.

His father Ted Brown was also a dual premiership player at Carlton, only Sergio and Stephen Silvagni have repeated this feat for the club.

His younger brother, John, also played for Carlton.

Death
He died on 11 May 1989.

See also
 The 1945 "Bloodbath" VFL Grand Final

Footnotes

External links

 
 
 Blueseum profile of Vin Brown
 Vin Brown, Boyles Football Photos. 

1922 births
Australian rules footballers from Victoria (Australia)
Carlton Football Club players
Carlton Football Club Premiership players
1989 deaths
Two-time VFL/AFL Premiership players